is a city located in Ibaraki Prefecture, Japan. , the city had an estimated population of 67,197 in 28,873 households and a population density of 634 persons per km2. The percentage of the population aged over 65 was 31.5%. Kashima is the home of the J. League's Kashima Antlers. Its home field, Kashima Soccer Stadium, was used as a site during the 2002 FIFA World Cup. The city is also the site of the Kashima Shrine,  one of the oldest  Shinto shrines in eastern Japan, and considered the birthplace of many influential styles of Japanese swordsmanship (Kenjutsu).

Geography
Kashima is located in southeastern Ibaraki Prefecture, bordered by the Pacific Ocean to the east and Lake Kitaura (Lake Kasumigaura) to the west, with a width of less than 10 kilometers from east-to-west. It is approximately 110 kilometers to the northeast of Tokyo.

Surrounding municipalities
Ibaraki Prefecture
 Itako
 Kamisu
Namegata
Hokota

Climate
Kashima has a Humid continental climate (Köppen Cfa) characterized by warm summers and cool winters with light snowfall.

Demographics
Per Japanese census data, the population of Kashima has recently plateaued after a long period of growth.

History
Kashima was developed from the Nara period together with the ichinomiya of Hitachi Province, Kashima Shrine. After the Meiji Restoration, the town of Kashima was established with the creation of the modern municipalities system on April 1, 1889 within Kashima District. In 1954, Kashima annexed with the neighboring villages of Takamatsu, Toyosu, Toyosato and Namino. Kashima merged with the village of Ono on September 1, 1995 and was elevated to city status.

Government
Kashima has a mayor-council form of government with a directly elected mayor and a unicameral city council of 20 members. Kashima contributes one member to the Ibaraki Prefectural Assembly. In terms of national politics, the city is part of Ibaraki 2nd district of the lower house of the Diet of Japan.

Economy
Kashima is the central city of the Kashima Industrial Zone, and it has a large industrial park with about 1500 factories, especially petrochemical and steel plants. The Japanese government created this zone in 1963, and the development was mostly completed in 1973. Agriculture and commercial fishing also play a part in the local economy.

Education
Kashima has 12 public elementary schools and five public middle schools operated by the city government, and one public high school operated by the Ibaraki Prefectural Board of Education. There are also one private middle school and two private high schools.

Seishin Gakuen Women's Junior College (1984-2003)

Sports
Kashima Antlers is the local J. League football club.

Transportation

Railway
 JR East – Kashima Line
  -  
 -  Kashima Rinkai Railway Ōarai Kashima Line
  -  -  -  -  -

Highway

Seaport
Port of Kashima

Sister city relations
 – Seogwipo, Jeju Province, Republic of Korea, since November 2003
 – Yancheng, Jiangsu Province, China, since November 2008

Local attractions
Kashima Shrine

Notable people from Kashima 
Tsukahara Bokuden, swordsman
Harumi Hanayagi, actress
Ryuta Sasaki, former professional soccer player
Hitoshi Sogahata, professional soccer player
Yuichi Nemoto, former professional soccer player
Yasutaka Nomoto, professional soccer player
Juri Takahashi, singer, dancer, K-pop idol and former J-pop idol, member of K-pop girlgroup Rocket Punch
Yoko Matsugane, gravure idol

Gallery

References

External links

Official Website 

 
Cities in Ibaraki Prefecture
Port settlements in Japan
Populated coastal places in Japan